Fast Track is a monthly information technology magazine published by 9.9 MediaWorx Pvt. Ltd and distributed along with Digit. It is an in-depth reference guide to any given sub-topic of information technology, such as web publishing and open source software, or a product, such as Photoshop. It covers topics related to Technology. The detail in the Fast Track series ranges from the beginner to the intermediate and often with references to advanced content.

References

External links
 Official website of The Digit Magazine

2001 establishments in India
9.9 Media Products
English-language magazines published in India
Home computer magazines
Computer magazines published in India
Monthly magazines published in India
Science and technology magazines published in India
Magazines established in 2001